Benito Stefanelli (2 September 1928 – 18 December 1999) was an Italian film actor, stuntman and weapons master who made over 60 appearances in film between 1955 and 1991.

Biography and career

Stefanelli is best known in world cinema for his roles as henchmen in several of Sergio Leone's Spaghetti Western films, portraying gang members in the trilogy of films A Fistful of Dollars (1964), For a Few Dollars More (1965), and The Good, the Bad and the Ugly (1966). He played the town drunk in Wanted (1967) starring Giuliano Gemma and Serge Marquand.
 
In his career, Stefanelli appeared in countless other western films and he worked simultaneously as a stunt coordinator (particularly during the 1960s and early 1970s) on the films that he performed in including those of Sergio Leone. A fluent English speaker, he also reportedly served as Clint Eastwood's interpreter together with Bill Thompkins on the set of A Fistful of Dollars.

Selected filmography

 Ulysses (1954) – Elatos (uncredited)
 Il terrore della maschera rossa (1960)
 Messalina (1960)
 La strada dei giganti (1960)
 La sceriffa (1960)
 L'ultimo dei vichinghi (1961) – Lorig, amico di Guntar (uncredited)
 Capitani di ventura (1961)
 The Trojan Horse (1961)
 Romolo e Remo (1961) – Soldato con Amulio
 The Slave (1962) – Nordic blond slave
 The Avenger (1962) – Nisius, Euryalus' Friend
 A Queen for Caesar (1962) – Commerciante #2 (uncredited)
 Revenge of the Musketeers (1963)
 Zorro and the Three Musketeers (1963)
  (1963) – Fritz
 L'ultima carica (1964)
 Grand Canyon Massacre (1964) – Gunman
 Castle of Blood (1964) – William
 A Fistful of Dollars (1964) – Rubio
 Per un dollaro a Tucson si muore (1964) – Charlie
 Revenge of The Gladiators (1964) – Ardenzio, gladiatore
 Blood for a Silver Dollar (1965) – James
 For a Few Dollars More (1965) – Luke 'Hughie' (Indio's Gang)
 Secret Agent Super Dragon (1966) - Kirk
 The Upper Hand (1966)
 100.000 dollari per Lassiter (1966) – Donovan, Foreman
 Ypotron – Final Countdown (1966) – Il sicario Dwan
 For a Few Extra Dollars (1966) – Juko
 The Big Gundown (1966) – Jess, Widow's Ranchero
 The Good, the Bad and the Ugly (1966) – Member of Angel Eyes' Gang #1
 The Hellbenders (1967) – Slim the Gambler
 Wanted (1967) – Billy Baker
 Gentleman Jo... uccidi (1967) – Larry
 Kill the Wicked! (1967)
 Day of Anger (1967) – Owen White – Killer
 Gunman Sent by God (1968)
 A Sky Full of Stars for a Roof (1968) – Rick (uncredited)
 Once Upon a Time in the West (1968) – Frank's Lieutenant (uncredited)
 Cemetery Without Crosses (1969) – Ben Caine (uncredited)
 The Price of Power (1969) – Sheriff Jefferson
 La notte dei serpenti (1969) – Pancho
 Er Più – storia d'amore e di coltello (1971) – Alfredo Di Lorenzo
 W Django! (1971) – Ibanez
 Trinity Is Still My Name (1971) – Stingary Smith
 Duck, You Sucker! (1971) – Soldier torturing Dr. Villega (deleted scene)
 So Sweet, So Dead (1972) – Lilly's Husband
 A Reason to Live, a Reason to Die (1972) – Samuel Pickett un ex condannato
 Le Amazzoni – Donne d'amore e di guerra (1973) – Erno
 My Name Is Nobody (1973) – Porteley
 War Goddess (1973) – Commander
 Charleston (1974) – Niccolo Cappocello (uncredited)
 White Fang to the Rescue (1974) – Jackson
 Violent Rome (1975) – Grocery Store Robber (uncredited)
 A Genius, Two Partners and a Dupe (1975) – Mortimer
 The Cop in Blue Jeans (1976) – Shelley's Henchman
 Crimebusters (1976) – Rapist (uncredited)
 Hit Squad (1976) – Gorniani – attorney-at-law
 El Macho (1977) – Sheriff
 The Payoff (1978) – Improta
 The Pumaman (1980) – Rankin, Kobras' Lieutenant
 La guerra del ferro – Ironmaster (1983) – Iskay
 White Fire (1985) – Barbossa (uncredited)
 Ladyhawke (1985) – Bishop's Guard (uncredited)
 Warbus (1986) – Debrard (uncredited)
 The Barbarians (1987) – Greyshaft (uncredited)
 Cobra Verde (1987) – Captain Pedro Vicente
 Un maledetto soldato (1988) – Andrew Teitelman (uncredited)
 Phantom of Death (1988) – Man in Restroom (uncredited)
 Transformations (1988) – Vapes
 The Pit and the Pendulum (1991) – Executioner (final film role)

References

External links
 

1929 births
1999 deaths
20th-century Italian male actors
Italian male film actors
Italian stunt performers
Male Spaghetti Western actors
Male actors from Rome
People of Lazian descent